The 2021 Big Sky Conference women's basketball tournament was the postseason basketball tournament held March 8–12, 2021, at Idaho Central Arena in Boise, Idaho. Idaho State won the tournament, their fourth title, earning an automatic bid to the 2021 NCAA tournament.

Seeds

Schedule

Bracket

References

2020–21 Big Sky Conference women's basketball season
Big Sky Conference women's basketball tournament
Basketball competitions in Boise, Idaho
College basketball tournaments in Idaho
Big Sky
Women's sports in Idaho